The Football South Australia Federation Cup, commonly known as the Federation Cup, is a knockout cup competition in Australian football, run by Football South Australia. The competition's origins date to 1907 when a club competition with six teams (Cambridge, North Adelaide, Norwood, Port Adelaide, South Adelaide, and West Adelaide) was established under the auspices of the British Association. In that first year, Cambridge defeated Hindmarsh in the final.

Since 2014 the Federation Cup has been incorporated as one of the qualification tournaments to determine participants in the national FFA Cup, now known as the Australia Cup.

Following the rebranding from Football Federation South Australia to Football South Australia, the cup was renamed to the Football South Australia Federation Cup.

Format
The competition is a knockout tournament starting with a Preliminary Round featuring clubs from a combination of the SA Collegiate Soccer League and the FFSA State League. The Preliminary Round is followed by Round 1 were all remaining teams from the FFSA State League and FFSA Premier League enter the competition along with usually a very small number of participating SA Collegiate Soccer League clubs.

In 2018, the competition begins with the first round consisting of all clubs competing in the State League 1 and State League 2 as well as clubs from the SA Amateur Soccer League and SA Collegiate Soccer League who wish to participate. National Premier League sides (excluding Adelaide United Youth) are then drawn in the second round.

Eligible teams
All team that play in Football South Australia sanctioned competition are eligible.

 NPL South Australia
 NPL State League
 South Australian Amateur Soccer League
 South Australian Collegiate Soccer League
 Regional tournaments affiliated with Football SA

Venues
Matches in the Football SA Federation Cup are usually played at the home ground of one of the two teams. The team who plays at home is decided when the matches are drawn. The final was historically held at Hindmarsh Stadium, but from 2022 onwards, the finals are held at ServiceFM Stadium

List of finals

Statistics

References

Soccer cup competitions in Australia
Recurring sporting events established in 1907